Benzin may refer to:
"Benzin", a German-language song by Rammstein
Benzin (film), 2017 Bulgarian film
Benzin (opera), 1929 German-language opera
Bięcino (German name ), village in the administrative district of Gmina Damnica

See also 
 Benzoin (disambiguation)